The Hayden Act, introduced by California Senator Tom Hayden as Senate Bill 1785 on February 18, 1998, amended California Law as it applies to companion animals.

Under the then-existing law, dogs or cats impounded by public pounds or shelters could be killed after 72 hours of being impounded. The Hayden Act, effective July 1, 1999, expanded this minimum impound time to 4 or 6 business days, as specified, and required that the animal be released to a nonprofit animal rescue or adoption organization in certain circumstances, subject to specified exceptions.

Authorship and ratification
Along with Hayden, law professor in animal law and nonprofit law Taimie Bryant of UCLA School of Law is also credited with writing the majority of the laws. The bill became law after then Governor Pete Wilson signed it on September 22, 1998.

Lawsuits

Lock v. Kern County, California 
In 2004, the first lawsuit filed under the Hayden Act, Petitioner Patricia Lock, represented by California attorney, and Animal Rights and Hayden Act expert, Kate Neiswender, sought an injunction prohibiting Kern County, California from violating the act by euthanizing companion animals prior to the expiration of the holding period and engaging in other prohibited conduct.

Johnson v. Kings County, California 
In 2007, a second lawsuit was filed under the Hayden Act by Petitioner Kara Johnson, represented by California attorney,Kate Neiswender. The case began with a shelter audit that found that the county-run animal control was not keeping accurate records, scanning for microchips, providing veterinary care to animals, nor following the minimum hold time of the Hayden Act. The lawsuit later resolved to the satisfaction of all parties.

Jacie Conaway v. San Bernardino County, California 
In 2007, Petitioner Jacie Conaway, represented by California attorney, and Animal Rights and Hayden Act expert, Okorie Okorocha, filed a similar action against San Bernardino County, California. The lawsuit later resolved to the satisfaction of all parties.They withdrew the lawsuit after they reviewed the county's response.  Resolution was obtained by the petitioner withdrawing the complaint and litigation filed against the County.

Rich Mc Lellan, M.D. v. Mendocino County, California 
In 2007, Rich Mc Lellan, M.D., the President of the California Chapter of the League of Humane Voters, represented by California attorney, and Animal Rights and Hayden Act expert, Okorie Okorocha filed an action against Mendocino County, California titled Mc Lellan v. County of Mendocino to have a statute enacted by the County, known as "Sec. 10.24.010 Voluntary Surrender of Animal for Euthanasia: Not Impoundment" which contradicted the Hayden Act, and allowed for the unlawful euthanization of companion animals, declared invalid by the Mendocino County, California Court.  The Mendocino County, California County Council repealed the statute before the case went to trial:

BOARD OF SUPERVISORS – SUMMARY/ACTION MINUTES – JUNE 19, 2007 PAGE 454
AGENDA ITEM NO. 10A – INTRODUCTION AND WAIVE THE READING OF AN ORDINANCE REPEALING MENDOCINO COUNTY CODE SECTION 10.24.010 IN ITS ENTIRETY – COUNTY COUNSEL
Presenter/s: Ms. Jeanine B. Nadel, County Counsel, introduced that matter, noting that this ordinance section directly contradicts State law (Food and Agricultural Code Sections), recommending it be repealed in its entirety.
Board Action: Upon motion by Supervisor Delbar, seconded by Supervisor Colfax, and carried (4, with Supervisor Wattenburger absent); IT IS ORDERED that the Board of Supervisors introduces and waives the reading of the ordinance repealing Mendocino County Code Section 10.24.010 in its entirety

References

California statutes
Euthanasia in the United States
Bioethics
Animal welfare and rights legislation in the United States